In abstract algebra, the Eakin–Nagata theorem states: given commutative rings  such that  is finitely generated as a module over , if  is a Noetherian ring, then  is a Noetherian ring. (Note the converse is also true and is easier.)

The theorem is similar to the Artin–Tate lemma, which says that the same statement holds with "Noetherian" replaced by "finitely generated algebra" (assuming the base ring is a Noetherian ring).

Proof 
The following more general result is due to Edward W. Formanek and is proved by an argument rooted to the original proofs by Eakin and Nagata.

Proof: It is enough to show that  is a Noetherian module since, in general, a ring admitting a faithful Noetherian module over it is a Noetherian ring. Suppose otherwise. By assumption, the set of all , where  is an ideal of  such that  is not Noetherian has a maximal element, .
for each nonzero ideal , the module  is Noetherian.
Next, consider the set  of submodules  such that  is faithful. Thus, it is clear that Zorn's lemma applies to the set , and so the set has a maximal element, . Now, if  is Noetherian, then it is a faithful Noetherian module over A and, consequently, A is a Noetherian ring, a contradiction.
each nonzero submodule  is such that  is not faithful.
Let a submodule  be given. Since  is not faithful, there is a nonzero element  such that . By assumption,  is Noetherian and so  is finitely generated. Since  is also finitely generated, it follows that  is finitely generated; i.e.,  is Noetherian, a contradiction.

References

Further reading 
 Math StackExchange - Exercise from Kaplansky's Commutative Rings and Eakin-Nagata Theorem

Theorems in ring theory
Commutative algebra